Emery d'Amboise (1434 – 13 November 1512) was Grand Master of the Knights Hospitaller from 1503 to 1512. He was the 41st Grand Master. He succeeded to Pierre d'Aubusson.

Early life
Emery d'Amboise was born in 1434 in the castle of Chaumont-sur-Loire, a stronghold of the powerful family of Amboise. He was the third son of Pierre d'Amboise (1408–1473), chamberlain of Charles VII and Louis XII and Anne of Bueil (1405–1458), daughter of Jean IV Bueil. His younger brother, George, was the future Cardinal d'Amboise, prime minister of Louis XII.

Gallery

Notes

1434 births
1512 deaths
Grand Masters of the Knights Hospitaller
16th-century French people